Luna E-6 No.3, also identified as No.2 and sometimes by NASA as Luna 1963B, was a Soviet spacecraft which was lost in a launch failure in 1963. It was a  Luna E-6 spacecraft, the second of twelve to be launched, and the second consecutive launch failure. It was intended to be the first spacecraft to perform a soft landing on the Moon, a goal which would eventually be accomplished by the final E-6 spacecraft, Luna 9.

Luna E-6 No.3 was launched at 09:26:14 UTC on 3 February 1963, atop a Molniya-L 8K78L carrier rocket, flying from Site 1/5 at the Baikonur Cosmodrome. A torque sensor in the gyroscope used to control the pitch of the upper stage malfunctioned, resulting in control of the rocket being lost. The spacecraft failed to achieve orbit, and reentered the atmosphere over the Pacific Ocean. Prior to the release of information about its mission, NASA correctly identified that it had been an attempt to land a spacecraft on the Moon. However, they believed the launch had occurred on 2 February.

References

External links

 Zarya - Luna programme chronology

Luna programme
Spacecraft launched in 1963